Kolumittayi (English: Stick Candy) is a 2016 Indian Malayalam-language children's film directed by Arun Viswam. The film set in the 1980s, tells the story of Unni (Gourav Menon) and his three friends Abu, Lalu, and Varkey. Others in the cast includes Saiju Kurup, Dinesh Prabhakar, Sohan Seenulal, Dr. Roney, Kalabhavan Prajod, Gokulan, Devi Ajith, Krishnaprabha, Priyanka and 30 other child actors.

Synopsis

The film opens to the life of Unni and his friends. After having a blast of a vacation, they move to the 6th grade after the new academic year opens. The life in school brings lot of joy to Unni because of the presence of his crush Riya. Unni feels threatened by the newcomer in his class – Roney, who happens to be talented in various disciplines of art. Soon they lock horns and are in competition. Unni and his friends with their happy go lucky nature get into odds with their teacher.

Cast 
 Gourav Menon as Unni
 Aakash Santhosh as Abu
 Baby Meenakshi as Riya
 Sidharth as Lalu
 Naif as Ronny
 Saiju Kurup as Satheeshan Puzhakkara
 Krishna Praba as Molly
 Anjali Aneesh Upasana as Daisy
 Kalabhavan Prajodh as Sudheer
 Bineesh Bastin
 Devi Ajith as Unni's Mother

Production
Arun Viswam who was assisted Abrid Shine in the projects, 1983 and Action Hero Biju. 30 child artists were selected through an audition conducted in co-operation with Kochu TV. The music and background scoring was done by Sreeraj Sahajan, mixing and mastering by Ramu Raj.  The choreography was by K. P. Sreejith and costumes by Steffy Zaviour

Critical reception
Sarath Ramesh Kuniyl from The Week rated 4 in a scale of 5, and said: "Kolumittayi cannot, and should not, be dismissed as a children's film with dollops of nostalgia. There is a lesson or two for the grown-ups as well".

References

External links 
 

 https://www.imdb.com/title/tt6198840/reference

2016 films
Films set in 1980
2010s Malayalam-language films